Korea Automobile Manufacturers Association, or KAMA, is a South Korean automobile and motor vehicle association established in July 1988. KAMA is a non-profit organization, representing the interests of automakers in Korea.

Members
Hyundai Motor Company
Kia Motors
GM Korea
Renault Samsung Motors
SsangYong Motor Company
Youngsin Metal Industrial Company

See also
Automotive industry in South Korea
Economy of South Korea
Japan Automobile Manufacturers Association

External links
Korea Automobile Manufacturers Association Homepage 

Automotive industry in South Korea
Trade associations based in South Korea
Organizations established in 1988
Motor trade associations